Sea View is a suburb of Poole, Dorset. The area is anchored by Sea View Road, which links Parkstone towards Canford Cliffs and Sandbanks.

History 
The Victorian Sea View pub was demolished and replaced with a Co-op in 2020.

Geography 
Despite the name, the sea cannot be seen from the area.

Politics 
Sea View is part of the Poole parliamentary constituency.

References 

Areas of Poole